Intercolegial de Baile is a popular dance competition held every year in several cities of Mexico. The competition was born in 1987 in Mexico City. It is divided in two rounds: Region and National, and also in three categories: Kids, Junior and Senior.

Region 

The first round starts in 7 regions of Mexico:
Centro: Host- Mexico City.
El Bajio: Host- Querétaro.
La Fuerza del Norte: Host- Monterrey.
Occidente: Host- Guadalajara.
Oriente Sur: Host- Veracruz
Reto Peninsula: Host- Mérida

From this round, the Top 15 groups (from each category) of the competition, pass to the next round.

National 
The 15 best groups of the country compete in the grand finale in Mexico City, (as of 2006, national competitions are held in different cities).
From here on, the competition gets bigger and bigger, until the final day.
At the end of the Competition, they give Special Awards that are:

 Best Idea- The Idea that had a storyline and was well developed from start to finish
 Friendship- The group that has the most fun and holds a great friendship with the rest of the groups. This award is decided by the contestants themselves.
 Best Image- The best image and clothing
 Best Crowd- The crowd from the city that most cheered or is more active
 United Award- The most united group
 Best Message- The group that gave the best message to the audience with their routine

Records and firsts 

In 2006, Intercolegial de Baile broke records:
 180 groups competed.
 3,000 contestants from 36 cities of Mexico.
 22,000 people on the event
 First time 10 groups of each category competed on the Grand Finale.
 First time the Finale was not held in Mexico City.
 In 2006, Xalapa became a host of Intercolegial de Baile.
 The national competition was held in Acapulco.
2007 also had records and firsts:
 Querétaro became a host of Intercolegial de Baile.
 First time a National Competition of Kids Category.
 2,800 contestants from 31 cities of Mexico
 Cancún became a host for Intercolegial de Baile.
 The national competition was held in Veracruz.

National Competition Results 
Señior Category:

Junior Category:

Kids Category:

Dance competitions